Indonesian Olympic Committee (abbreviate: KOI) is the national Olympic committee of Indonesia and the member of Olympic Council of Asia. Their duty is to organize Indonesian participation in international sporting events, such as Summer Olympic Games, Asian Games, Southeast Asian Games, etc. As well as submitting bid for Indonesia as the host, planning and organizing official international sporting events to be held in Indonesia. This function was previously held by National Sports Committee of Indonesia ( or KONI).

History
The Indonesian Olympic Committee was founded in 1946. KOI was separated from KONI in 2005 according to Act Number 3 of 2005 about National Sport System, and further enforced with Government Regulation Number 17 of 2007 about the organizing of sporting events. KOI was the member of International Olympic Committee (IOC) since March 11, 1952.

Organization 
The Executive Board
 President: Raja Sapta Oktohari
 Vice President: Warih Sadono
 Secretary General: Ferry J. Kono
Vice Secretary General I: Harry Warganegara
 Vice Secretary General II: Wijaya M. Noeradi
Vice Secretary General III: Josephine Tampubolon
 Treasurer: Richard Sosrodjojo
Executive Committee:
Teuku Arlan Perkasa Lukman
Jadi Rajagukguk
Antonius Adi Wirawan
Ismail Ning
Rafiq Hakim Radinal
Indra Gamulya
Suryo Agung Wibowo
Puji Lestari

See also
Indonesia at the Olympics

References

External links
 Official website

National Olympic Committees
Oly
Indonesia at the Olympics
Sports organizations established in 1946
1946 establishments in Indonesia